James William Clarke (born 18 September 1982) is an English former professional footballer who played as a midfielder or defender.

He began his career with Mansfield Town in 2002, and went on to join Rochdale in 2004 and Boston United in 2006. After a year with The Pilgrims he was signed by Grimsby Town where
he remained for three seasons before being released in 2010. He briefly joined York City before moving on to Gainsborough Trinity. He signed with Guiseley in August 2011 and played for the club until December 2012 when he emigrated to Thailand to become a football coach at an academy. He then played in Scotland for Broughty Athletic, Arbroath and Montrose.

Career

Mansfield Town
Born in Sunderland, Tyne and Wear, Clarke was brought up into the first team at Mansfield Town in the 2001–02 season, after being promoted from the club's youth system. He made his debut on 1 April 2002, in a 5–3 defeat against Luton Town, and scored his first goal against Blackpool in April 2003. Clarke remained with Mansfield until the end of the 2003–04 campaign, where he then was released.

Rochdale
Upon his release from Mansfield, Clarke signed a two-year contract for League Two side Rochdale. He remained with the club throughout the 2004–05 and 2005–06 seasons, and went on to make over 60 appearances in all competitions for the club, scoring once against Lincoln City.

Boston United
His next port of call was to join Boston United in January 2006. Here, Clarke was a first team regular, in a season where the club eventually went on to lose their Football League status, and were relegated on the final day of the season, losing to Wrexham. Clarke left Boston a few weeks after the end of the 2006–07 season.

Grimsby Town
Only a few weeks after the end of the 2006–07 season, Clarke was the first new face in at Grimsby Town for the 2007–08 campaign. Manager Alan Buckley brought him in as the club's new right back, to cater for the vacant spot left by retiring and long serving legend John McDermott. Despite this, Clarke was also deployed in midfield during his first season. He managed to make an appearance at Wembley Stadium for the club, as they lost 2–0 to Milton Keynes Dons in the Final of the Football League Trophy. In the 2008–09 season, Buckley signed Robbie Stockdale as the club's first choice right back, giving Clarke an uphill struggle to claim a place in the team. His adopted midfield role was his main role throughout the season. However, when Buckley was sacked, his replacement Mike Newell opted to bring in fresh faces in both defence and midfield, making several players come ahead of Clarke in the pecking order. Clarke eventually would only be called upon in the event of illness or injury. At the end of the season, Newell commented on BBC Radio Humberside that Clarke as well as fellow utility player Danny Boshell may still be offered a fresh deal, and Clarke put pen to paper to sign a fresh one-year deal a week later. On 13 January 2010, new manager Neil Woods told Clarke, along with Danny Boshell, Matthew Heywood and Barry Conlon that they were free to leave the club in the January transfer window. Clarke was released by the club on 2 February 2010, along with Boshell and Heywood.

York City
A few hours after his release from Grimsby, Clarke signed for Conference Premier team York City on a contract until the end of the 2009–10 season. He made his debut in a 2–1 defeat to Barrow in the FA Trophy quarter-final on 2 March 2010. This was followed by his league debut in a 2–1 defeat to Salisbury City. He finished the season with eight appearances for York and was released by the club on 18 May 2010.

Gainsborough Trinity and Guiseley
Clarke went on trial with newly relegated Conference Premier team Darlington in July 2010 and he played in a 3–0 pre-season friendly defeat to Carlisle United. He then had a trial with Gateshead in August. Following a trial with St Johnstone of the Scottish Premier League, Clarke eventually signed for Conference North team Gainsborough Trinity in August 2010. Clarke was released in May 2011.

On 6 July 2011 he signed for fellow Conference North side Guiseley, going on to make 55 appearances including defeat in the 2011–12 Conference North play-off semi finals. In December 2012 he announced his departure from the club by revealing he had accepted a job to become a coach at a football academy in Chang Mai in Thailand.

Arbroath and Montrose
After a short spell with Scottish Junior club Broughty Athletic, Clarke signed for Scottish League Two club Arbroath in July 2015. After being released by Arbroath, Clarke joined Montrose in January 2016. In July 2016, Montrose announced that he had left the club due to work commitments.

Coaching career
Clarke previously spent time coaching at the Traidhos Football Academy in Chiang Mai, Thailand. After his short stint in Scotland with both Montrose and Arbroath Clarke accepted a position to become a football coach once again for a football development project linking Thai footballers to English football teams, in Bangkok, Thailand.

Clarke joined Traill International School as head coach until March 2021 before leaving to join Thai Amateur team FCBangSaoTong (Formerly known as QonQuest FC) as head coach where he has been tasked to help the team qualify for the Thai League 3 competition.

Career statistics

References

External links

 (appearances from 2002 to 2012)
 (Arbroath appearances)
 (Montrose appearances)

1982 births
Living people
Footballers from Sunderland
English footballers
Association football defenders
Association football midfielders
Association football utility players
Mansfield Town F.C. players
Rochdale A.F.C. players
Boston United F.C. players
Grimsby Town F.C. players
York City F.C. players
Gainsborough Trinity F.C. players
Guiseley A.F.C. players
English Football League players
National League (English football) players
Arbroath F.C. players
Montrose F.C. players
Scottish Professional Football League players